Edinburgh Northern Tramways operated a cable hauled tramway service in Edinburgh between 1888 and 1897.

History

The service started on 28 January 1888 with a line along Hanover Street and Dundas Street to Ferry Road, Goldenacre. The depot and power station were located on Henderson Row. A second line opened on 17 February 1890 from George Street along Frederick Street and Howe Street through Stockbridge to Comely Bank.

Closure

On 1 January 1897 it was taken over by the Edinburgh and District Tramways.

References

Tram transport in Scotland
Transport in Edinburgh
Edinburgh Trams
History of Edinburgh
Cable car railways in the United Kingdom